Soviet integrated circuit designation is an industrial specification for encoding of names of integrated circuits manufactured in the Soviet Union and Post-Soviet Union countries. 25 years after the dissolution of the Soviet Union, a number of manufacturers in Russia, Belarus, Ukraine, Latvia, and Uzbekistan still use this designation.

The designation uses the Cyrillic alphabet which sometimes leads to confusion where a Cyrillic letter has the same appearance as a Latin letter but is romanized as a different letter. Furthermore, for some Cyrillic letters the Romanization is ambiguous.

History
The nomenclature for integrated circuits has changed somewhat over the years as new standards were published:
 1968 – NP0.034.000 (Russian: НП0.034.000) 
 1973 – GOST 18682—73 (Russian: ГОСТ 18682—73) 
 1980 – OST 11.073.915—80 (Russian: ОСТ 11.073.915—80) 
 2000 – OST 11.073.915—2000 (Russian: ОСТ 11.073.915—2000) 
 2010 – GOST RV 5901-005—2010 (Russian: ГОСТ РВ 5901-005—2010) 
Throughout this article the standards are referred to by the year they came into force. Before 1968 each manufacturer used its own integrated circuit designation. Following the dissolution of the Soviet Union in 1991, the standards were not as strictly enforced, and a number of manufacturers introduced manufacturer-specific designations again. These were typically used in parallel with the standards. However, integrated circuits for military, aerospace, and nuclear applications in Russia still have to follow the standard designation. Underlining this, the 2010 standard is explicitly labelled a Russian military standard. Beside Russia the 2010 standard is applied in Belarus as well. Companies in Ukraine mostly stayed with the 1980 standard and prefixed the designation with the letter У (U), e.g. УМ5701ВЕ51. The 1980 standard was published in Ukraine as DSTU 3212—95. Bulgarian designations for bipolar integrated circuits, e.g. 1УО709С, look confusingly similar to the 1968 Soviet designations but the standards differ. The functional group is also indicated by two letters in the Cyrillic alphabet and many groups were obviously copied from the Soviet standard (АГ, ИД, ИЕ, ЛБ, ЛН, ЛП, МП, ПК, СА, УС). Some subgroups differ (ТД, УМ, УО) and some groups are completely different (НС, ОИ, РН). For the number after the functional group there is no concept of a series. Instead, that number usually matches the Western counterpart (e.g. the 1УО709С is equivalent to a μA709).

Also as a consequence of dissolution of the Soviet Union, COCOM restrictions were lifted and Russian integrated circuit design firms gained access to foundries abroad. In that sense it could be argued that the importance of the Soviet designation has spread across the globe. When foundries are not able to label the circuit in the Cyrillic alphabet then the Latin alphabet is used (e.g. KF1174PP1).

In general, devices already in production when a new standard came out kept their old designation. However, in some case devices were renamed:
 When the 1980 standard was published, devices named after the 1968 standard and still in production were renamed, e.g. К1ЛБ553 to К155ЛА3. As in this example, the renaming was often fairly straightforward: The two parts of the serial number were combined (1 and 55 to 155), the functional group remained unchanged or was converted as in the table below (ЛБ to ЛА), and the variant number remained unchanged (3). In some series the renaming was more complicated. This change affected many series (e.g. 101, 116, 118, 122, 133, 140, 153, 155, 174, 237, 501).
 Before the introduction of a package designation in 1980 the suffix П (P) was used in some series to indicate a plastic package (as opposed to the then more-common ceramic package). In 1983 the package designation was changed for the 531 series (e.g. К531ЛА19П to КР531ЛА19). Other series were similarly renamed at some point (e.g. К501ХЛ1П to КР501ХЛ1).
 Before the definition of group В (V) in 1980 computing devices were all assigned subgroup ИК (IK), e.g. microprocessors (КР580ИК80А), peripheral devices (КР580ИК51А). With the introduction of group В the devices in the 580 series were renamed (to КР580ВМ80А and КР580ВВ51А, respectively) in 1986.
 Since the publication of the 2000 standard, some devices have been labeled with the package designation according to the new standard, e.g. КР1407УД2 to К1407УД2Р and КФ1407УД2 to К1407УД2Т.
 Starting in 2016, certain newer devices were renamed according to the 2010 standard, e.g. 1967ВЦ2Ф to 1967ВН028 and 1586ПВ1АУ to 1583НВ025 (note the change of the series).

Structure of the designation

Structure (1968)

Structure (1973 / 1980)

Structure (2000)

Structure (2010)

Elements:
  – Prefix (zero to three letters)
  – Export designation: The letter Э (E) here indicates an integrated circuit intended for export with a pin spacing of 2.54mm (1/10") or 1.27mm (1/20"). If this element is empty then the device has the Soviet (metric) spacing of 2.5mm or 1.25mm between pins.
  – Application area: The letter К (K) here indicates an integrated circuit for commercial and consumer applications (with requirements according to GOST 18725—83). If this element is empty then the device is intended for harsher environments (e.g. extended temperature range) which is also referred to as military acceptance (ВП).
  – Package designation (1980) (Note that the letters Э and К are not valid package designations. If this element is empty then the package is simply not specified in the designation, i.e. it could be any of the packages.)
  – Series (three or four digits)
  – Manufacturing technology (one digit):
 Monolithic integrated circuits: 1, 5, or 6
 Monolithic integrated circuits – bare chip without package: 7
 Hybrid integrated circuits: 2, 4, or 8
 Other integrated circuits (e.g. thin film): 3
 Multi-chip modules: 9
  – For four-digit series the second digit of the number of the series has significance as well:
 Series for household electronics: 0
 Series of analogue devices: 1
 Series of operational amplifiers: 4
 Series of digital devices: 5
 Series of memory devices: 6
 Series of microprocessor families: 8
  – Number of the series (2 digits): The numbers of the series are assigned sequentially and have no further meaning. Devices in a series have some characteristic in common although it varies from one series to another which characteristic that is (e.g. logic family for logic gates, instruction set for microprocessors).
  – Number of the series (2 or 3 digits): The 2000 / 2010 standards do not assign a special meaning to the second digit of a 4-digit series.
  – Functional Group (two letters)
  – Group
  – Subgroup within the group: All groups have the subgroup П (P) for "others", that is for devices that fall into the group but not into any of the other defined subgroups.
  – Functional Group (2010): The functional groups for the 2010 standard are in a separate table since the change from 2000 to 2010 is far more drastic than any of the previous changes.
  – Variant within the functional subgroup (one to four digits): Usually the variant numbers are assigned sequentially for devices within the subgroup (e.g. ЛА1, ЛА2, ЛА3, etc.). In some series the variant number matches the last two or three digits of the designation of its Western counterpart (e.g. К500ЛК117 and MC10117).
  – For the 2010 standard, the variant is always 2 digits in length, with a leading zero if necessary. When there is no version letter then the variant appears to be 3 digits in length (e.g. 1906ВМ016) but the third digit is actually the package designation (element 5e).
  – Suffix
  – Version (one letter, А to Я except З and Й): This optional element indicates versions of an integrated circuit with different electrical or thermal characteristics (e.g. switching speed, voltage range, etc.). It can also indicate an improved version of a device (e.g. К580ИК80 vs. К580ИК80А). Before 1980 the suffix П (P) was sometimes used to indicate a version in a plastic package instead of a ceramic package (e.g. К145ИК2П, К531ЛА19П) or a round metal can (e.g. К144ИР1П).
  – Version (one letter, А to М except З and Й): This element is omitted if there is only one version of a device.
  – Package designation (2000) (one letter, Н to Я): If this element is empty then the package is simply not specified in the designation, i.e. it could be any of the packages. Note that the letter ranges for version and package designation do not overlap.
  – Manufacturer designation (two letters)
  – Package designation (2010) (one digit or letter Н)
  – Package variant (one letter; А, В, С, Е, Н, К, М, Р, Т, or Х): If variants of an integrated circuit have the same parameters and package designation but differ in pinout or number of pins, then this package variant letter is added (e.g. 5400ТР045 and 5400ТР045А). Some vendors assign version letters outside the allowed range (e.g. 1395ЕН10Ж5Б).
  – Version (one letter; А, В, С, Е, К, М, Р, Т, or Х): This element is omitted if there is only one version of a device. Note that for the 2010 standard a different package is indicated by element 5f instead. Some vendors assign version letters outside the allowed range (e.g. 1494УА02Б3).

Functional groups

Functional groups (2010)

Packages

Package designation (1973)
The package of an integrated circuit was generally not indicated in the 1973 designation, except:
 Bare chips without a package received a series number in the 7xx range, e.g. K712RV2-1 (К712РВ2-1).
 The suffix П (P) was sometimes used to indicate a version in a plastic package instead of a ceramic package (e.g. К145ИК2П, К531ЛА19П) or a round metal can (e.g. К144ИР1П).
 Less common than П, the suffix М (M) was sometimes used to indicate a ceramic package and Т (T) for a metal-ceramic package (e.g. К500ТМ133М and К500ТМ133Т, respectively, instead of К500ТМ133 in a plastic package).

Package designation (1980)

Package designation (2000)

Package designation (2010)

Bare chips
For bare chips without a package an additional digit indicates the constructive variant. For the 1973 and 1980 standards the variant digit is appended with a dash after the designation (e.g. К712РВ2-1 and Б533ТМ2-2, respectively). For the 2000 and 2010 standards the variant digit follows immediately after the package designation N (e.g. 5862ПФ1Н4 and 1374МХ01Н1, respectively).

Manufacturer designation
A manufacturer designation was introduced only with the 2000 standard. As part of the type designation the manufacturer is required only for a second-source integrated circuit that was "developed and produced according to an  independently developed design and technological documentation, and corresponding to the technical requirements of the originally developed original microcircuit". Manufacturer logos are more common.

Other manufacturers which as of 2016 used a version of the Soviet integrated circuit designation include NTC Module, MCST, ELVEES Multicore, Fizika, Sapfir, NPK TTs, and Progress, all of them in Moscow, as well as PKK Milandr, Soyuz, and NIITAP in Zelenograd, SKTB ES Voronezh, Proton and Proton-Impuls Oryol, Planeta Novgorod, NIIEMP Penza, Eltom Tomilino, Krip Tekhno Alexandrov, DELS Minsk, Kvazar Kyiv, Krystal Kyiv, Elektronni Komponenti Ivano-Frankivsk, Dnepr Kherson, and Foton Tashkent.

Other markings
Although not strictly part of the designation, a number of markings are often found on integrated circuit packages:

Military acceptance here means that the integrated circuit can be used in applications where its failure would be catastrophic and where repair or exchange is difficult or impossible (e.g. aerospace applications).

For mask-programmed devices (e.g. gate arrays, mask-programmed single-chip microcontrollers, mask ROMs) a three- or four-digit mask number follows the type designation (e.g. К1801ВП1-014).

For bare chips a one-digit constructive variant identifier follows the type designation.

A date code is usually printed on the package. In the early 1970s the date code consisted of a Roman numeral for the month and a two-digit year (e.g. IX 72). Later the month was given as one or two digits (e.g. 5-73 or 0386). In the late 1980s most plants switched to a 4-digit code with a 2-digit year followed by a 2-digit month (e.g. 8909) or a 2-digit week (e.g. 9051). Overall, the date code format was not strictly enforced. Several series of integrated circuits (e.g. 1408, 1821) bore an IEC 60062 letter and digit code (e.g. A1 for January 1990).

Romanization
The Romanization of Russian is standardized, but there are at least 12 standards to choose from. Fortunately, the Soviet integrated circuit designation uses a subset of the Cyrillic alphabet where only a few letters are ambiguous:
 Ж: Ž, Zh
 Х: X, H, Ch, Kh
 Ц: C, Cz, Ts, Tc
 Ч: Č, Ch
The more-common romanizations in bold are given as alternatives in the above tables.

Е and Э are both romanized as E.

The French romanization of Russian and the German romanization of Russian differ in some letters from the one used in English. For instance, the Russian КР580ВМ80A becomes KR580VM80A in English and French but KR580WM80A in German literature.

See also
 7400 series: Second sources in Europe and the Eastern Bloc
 Commons:Gallery of Soviet integrated circuits
 List of 7400-series integrated circuits
 List of Soviet microprocessors
 Pro Electron: Integrated circuits
 Russian tube designations

References

Computing in the Soviet Union
Electronics lists